Lunceford is a surname. Notable people with the surname include:

Brent Lunceford (1965-present), American scientist and inventor
David Lunceford (1934–2009), American football player
Jimmie Lunceford (1902–1947),  American jazz alto saxophonist and bandleader in the swing era
Simon Lunceford (died  1390), Member of the Parliament of England